Clarence Henry II (born March 19, 1937), known as Clarence "Frogman" Henry, is an American rhythm and blues singer and pianist, best known for his hits "Ain't Got No Home" (1956) and "(I Don't Know Why) But I Do" (1961).

Career
Clarence Henry was born in New Orleans, Louisiana, United States, in 1937, moving to the Algiers neighborhood in 1948. He started learning piano as a child, with Fats Domino and Professor Longhair being his main influences.  When Henry played in talent shows, he dressed like Longhair and wore a wig with braids on both sides.  He joined Bobby Mitchell & the Toppers in 1952, playing piano and trombone, before leaving when he graduated in 1955 to join saxophonist Eddie Smith's band.

He used his trademark croak to improvise the song "Ain't Got No Home" one night in 1955.  Chess Records' A&R man Paul Gayten heard the song, and had Henry record it in Cosimo Matassa's studio in September 1956.  Initially promoted by local DJ Poppa Stoppa, the song eventually rose to number 3 on the national R&B chart and number 20 on the US pop chart.  The gimmick earned Henry his nickname of 'Frogman' and jump-started a career that endures to this day.

He toured nationally with a six-piece band until 1958, and continued to record. A cover of Bobby Charles' hit  "(I Don't Know Why) But I Do", and "You Always Hurt the One You Love", both from 1961, were his other big hits.
 
Henry opened eighteen concerts for the Beatles across the US and Canada in 1964, but his main source of income came from the Bourbon Street strip in New Orleans, where he played for nineteen years. His name could still draw hordes of tourists long after his hit-making days had ended. He still plays at various conventions, including the New Orleans Jazz & Heritage Festival.

Honors 
Henry's pioneering contribution to the genre has been recognized by the Rockabilly Hall of Fame. In April 2007, Henry was honored for his contributions to Louisiana music with induction into the Louisiana Music Hall of Fame.

Covers and re-use of Henry's hits 
The Band recorded a version of Henry's 1956 song "Ain't Got No Home" for their 1973 album Moondog Matinee. It was also used in a famous bathtub scene in the cult movie The Lost Boys with actor Corey Haim singing along to it. 

On his 1981 Live/Indian Summer album, Al Stewart introduced his song "Year of the Cat" with an odd anecdote about a mistaken-identity encounter involving Henry, Audrey Hepburn, and G. Gordon Liddy wearing an Elvis Presley mask. 

Henry's original song was later featured on the soundtrack of the 1982 film Diner. It also may be heard in a scene; Shrevie (Daniel Stern) is listening to it on his car radio and singing along.

Rod Stewart uses the chorus of  "Ain't Got No Home" in his 1984 single "Some Guys Have All the Luck". It achieved fresh notoriety in the 1990s through its use as the "Homeless Update" theme music on The Rush Limbaugh Show, and is still used as recently as December 7, 2017. 

This song is also in the 1995 movie Casino playing in the background as Joe Pesci asks Robert De Niro for a 50K chip marker. Jimmy Buffett referenced  Henry in his song "Saxophones". Henry made a cameo appearance on the third season opening episode of the HBO series Treme. 

His 1961 hit, "(I Don't Know Why) But I Do", was covered by Bobby Vinton in 1972 in a pop version. It was also used in a 2019 commercial for Expedia, showcasing its ability to provide dog-friendly hotel accommodations.

Discography

Singles

References

External links
 Neworleansfrogman.com
 Tsimon.com

1937 births
Living people
American male singers
American rhythm and blues musicians
Rhythm and blues musicians from New Orleans
Argo Records artists
Cadet Records artists
Singers from Louisiana